Granite Dome is a 10,320-foot-elevation (3,146 meter) mountain summit located in Tuolumne County, California, United States.

Description
Granite Dome is set within the Emigrant Wilderness on land managed by Stanislaus National Forest. The peak is part of the Sierra Nevada mountain range and is situated 2.1 miles west of line parent Black Hawk Mountain, and four miles southeast of Three Chimneys. Precipitation runoff from this mountain drains south to the Tuolumne River via Cherry Creek, and north to the Middle Fork Stanislaus River via Relief and Summit creeks. The landform's descriptive toponym was applied by the USGS, has been officially adopted by the U.S. Board on Geographic Names, and has appeared in publications since at least 1899. This landform is the only one officially named "Granite Dome" in the United States despite being located just nine miles north of Yosemite National Park which is well known for its granite domes.

Climate
According to the Köppen climate classification system, Granite Dome is located in an alpine climate zone. Most weather fronts originate in the Pacific Ocean, and travel east toward the Sierra Nevada mountains. As fronts approach, they are forced upward by the peaks (orographic lift), causing moisture in the form of rain or snowfall to drop onto the range.

See also
 
 Kennedy Peak
 Granite Domes of Yosemite National Park

References

External links
 Weather forecast: Granite Dome
 NGS Data Sheet

Mountains of Tuolumne County, California
North American 3000 m summits
Mountains of Northern California
Sierra Nevada (United States)
Stanislaus National Forest